The Cooper T43 was a Formula One and Formula Two racing car designed and built by Cooper Car Company for the 1957 Formula One season, first appearing at the 1957 Monaco Grand Prix in a works car for Jack Brabham. The T43 earned a significant place in motor racing history when Stirling Moss drove a Rob Walker Racing Team T43 to win the 1958 Argentine Grand Prix, the first World Drivers' Championship win for a mid-engined car. Despite this achievement, the car was superseded almost immediately by the T45. The T43's last appearance in a World Championship event was the 1960 Italian Grand Prix.

Bob Gerard purchased a T43 chassis and fitted it with a Bristol engine. This car was given an official Cooper works number as the T44.

Complete Formula One World Championship results
(key) (results in bold indicate pole position, results in italics indicate fastest lap)

 The World Constructors' Championship was not awarded before 1958.   Shared drive.   No points scored by the T43 as it was run in a Formula Two Category.  Points also scored by the Cooper T45.   Points also scored by the Cooper T51.   Points also scored by the Cooper T51 and Cooper T53.   Gerard's car designated T44.

See also
The first true Formula One Coopers

External links

http://www.f1-images.de/009900 - Race results
https://web.archive.org/web/20071011020230/http://www.formula2.net/ - Race results

Formula Two cars
Cooper Formula One cars
Tasman Series cars